Voyage of Oblivion is a 2012 album from Jim Johnston, featuring Emily Barker on guest vocals.

References

2012 debut albums